Ravex in Tezuka World is a 2009 18-minute anime short film by Japanese band Ravex. It was featured in the album Trax, celebrating the 20th anniversary of Avex as well as the 80th birthday of Osamu Tezuka.

Plot
As "another story" set after the end of the original manga, the plot starts after Astro is found on an asteroid after his final act to save Earth (shown in the 1960s anime). The robot boy is rescued by the three members of Ravex, and he is miraculously revived by "Space Jack". The newly revived robot is named "Ratom" - built by combining Rock with Astro, and equipped with the power of music.

Professor Ochanomizu works with Space Jack to create the newly evolved Ratom.

Characters
A number of Tezuka characters appeared in the anime short.
Main:

 Astro Boy
 Rock Holmes
 Princess Sapphire
 Ravex members (Shinichi Osawa, Taku Takahashi, Tanaka Tomoyuki)

Supporting:

 Pinoko
 Tink
 Hyakkimaru
 Unico
 Melmo
 Black Jack (known as "Space Jack")

Music
-Inserted Songs-

 "Dark Silence"
 "House Nation feat. Lisa"
 "Believe in Love feat. BoA"
 "Just the Two of Us feat. Tohoshinki"
 "Golden Luv feat. Maki Goto"
 "1 More Night feat. Monkey Majik"
 "Bangalicious feat. Anna Tsuchiya"
 "V.I.P.P. (Very Important Party People) feat. TRF & Verbal (M-Flo)"
 "I Rave U feat. DJ Ozma"
 " feat. Yūko Andō"

2000s animated short films
2009 anime films
Anime short films
Astro Boy
Films based on works by Osamu Tezuka
Osamu Tezuka anime
Science fiction anime and manga
Tezuka Productions